The Perilampidae are a small family within the Chalcidoidea, composed mostly of hyperparasitoids. The family is closely related to the Eucharitidae, and the eucharitids appear to have evolved from within the Perilampidae, thus rendering the family paraphyletic (if the two families are joined in the future, the name with precedence is Eucharitidae). As presently defined, at least 15 genera and 270 species are described worldwide. They are often brilliantly metallic (especially blue or green), with robust mesosomae and a small, triangular metasomae (swollen and bulbous in the Philomidinae). They are generally very strongly sculptured. The prothorax is typically very broad and disc-like, and the labrum is multidigitate, a feature shared with the Eucharitidae.

Another feature shared by the Eucharitidae and Perilampidae is the first-instar larvae are called "planidia" and are responsible for gaining access to the host, rather than the egg-laying females. Those species which are hyperparasitoids burrow into a secondary host's body and seek out endoparasitoid larvae, such as tachinid flies or ichneumonoid wasps, and attack them.

Genera
These 17 genera belong to the family Perilampidae:

 Aperilampus Walker, 1871 c g
 Austrotoxeuma Girault, 1929 c g
 Brachyelatus Hoffer & Novicky, 1954 c g
 Burksilampus Boucek, 1978 c g
 Chrysolampus Spinola, 1811 c g
 Chrysomalla Forster, 1859 c g
 Elatomorpha Zerova, 1970 c g
 Euperilampus Walker, 1871 c g b
 Jambiya Heraty & Darling, 2007
 Krombeinius Boucek, 1978 c g
 Monacon Waterston, 1922 c g
 Parelatus Girault, 1916 c g
 Perilampus Latreille, 1809 i c g b
 Philomides Haliday, 1862 c g
 Sericops Kriechbaumer, 1894 c g
 Sinoperilampites Hong, 2002 g
 Steffanolampus Peck, 1974 c g

Data sources: i = ITIS, c = Catalogue of Life, g = GBIF, b = Bugguide.net

References

External links 
Universal Chalcidoidea Database
Immature States

Chalcidoidea
Apocrita families